West Park is a census-designated place (CDP) in Cumberland County, New Jersey, United States. It is in the northwest part of the county, within Hopewell Township, and it is bordered to the east by the city of Bridgeton, the county seat. New Jersey Route 49 passes through the CDP, northwest  to Salem.

West Park was first listed as a CDP prior to the 2020 census.

Demographics

References 

Census-designated places in Cumberland County, New Jersey
Census-designated places in New Jersey
Hopewell Township, Cumberland County, New Jersey